Virginia Bass "Ginger" Wetherell (born May 15, 1947) is an American businesswoman and politician.

Biography
Wetherell was from Pensacola, Florida. She received her bachelor's degree in biological science and psychology from Auburn University in 1968 and he master's degree in counseling from Jacksonville State University in 1972. Wetherell also went to the John F. Kennedy School of Government, for professional development, in 1997. Wetherell was involved with several Bass family businesses in Pensacola and served as president of the Wetherell Consulting, Inc. Wetherell served  in the Florida House of Representatives from November 2, 1982, to November 8, 1988, and was a Democrat. Wetherall was married to T.K. Wetherell who also served in the Florida Legislature. Wetherell also served as Florida Secretary of Environment Protection from 1991 to 1998.

Notes

1947 births
Living people
People from Pensacola, Florida
Businesspeople from Florida
Auburn University alumni
Jacksonville State University alumni
Harvard Kennedy School alumni
Women state legislators in Florida
Democratic Party members of the Florida House of Representatives
21st-century American women